
Gmina Galewice is a rural gmina (administrative district) in Wieruszów County, Łódź Voivodeship, in central Poland.

Villages
Gmina Galewice contains the villages and settlements of Biadaszki, Brzeziny, Brzózki, Dąbie, Dąbrówka, Foluszczyki, Galewice, Gąszcze, Grądy, Jeziorna, Kaski, Kaźmirów, Konaty, Kostrzewy, Kużaj, Niwiska, Okoń, Osiek, Osowa, Ostrówek, Pędziwiatry, Plęsy, Przybyłów, Rybka Lututowska, Rybka Sokolska, Spóle, Węglewice, Załozie and Żelazo.

Neighbouring gminas
Gmina Galewice is bordered by the gminas of Czajków, Doruchów, Grabów nad Prosną, Klonowa, Lututów, Sokolniki and Wieruszów.

References
Polish official population figures 2011

Galewice
Wieruszów County